Archips tharsaleopus is a species of moth of the family Tortricidae. It is found in Zhejiang and Yunnan, China.

The length of the forewings is about 10 mm. The forewings are yellow with a dark brown pattern. The hindwings are greyish brown below the discal cell and yellowish brown near the apex.

Subspecies
Archips tharsaleopus tharsaleopus (China: Chekiang)
Archips tharsaleopus weixiensis Liu, 1987 (China: Yunnan)
Archips tharsaleopus yunnanus Razowski, 1977 (China: Yunnan)

References

Moths described in 1935
Archips
Moths of Asia